Events from the year 1891 in Ireland.

Events
March – Anti-Parnellites form the Irish National Federation and win seats in Sligo and Carlow.
June – Charles Stewart Parnell marries Kitty O'Shea in Sussex.
6 October – Charles Stewart Parnell dies. Up to 200,000 people attend the funeral of the 'Uncrowned King of Ireland.'
 The Balfour Land Act makes more funds available for land purchase and sets up the Congested Districts Board for Ireland.
 The Irish Daily Independent newspaper is founded. It becomes the Irish Independent in 1905.
 James Stephens, founder of the Irish Republican Brotherhood, returns home to Ireland after 25 years in exile.
 Michael Davitt, standing as an anti-Parnellite candidate, is defeated by John Redmond in a Waterford by-election.

Arts and literature
 April – Oscar Wilde publishes The Picture of Dorian Gray in book form.
 October – 9-year-old James Joyce writes a poem in memory of Parnell later entitled Et tu, Healy which his father has printed as a broadside.
 Standish James O'Grady publishes Finn and his Companions.

Sport

Football
International
7 February  Ireland 7–2 Wales (in Belfast)
7 March  England 6–1 Ireland (in Wolverhampton)
March  Scotland 2–1 Ireland (in Glasgow)

Irish League
Winners: Linfield (first ever winners)

Irish Cup
Winners: Linfield 4–2 Ulster

Belfast Celtic F.C. is founded.
Derry Olympic is founded. It joins the Irish Football League the next year, but only lasts one season.

Gaelic games
 All-Ireland Senior Hurling Championship Final
Kerry 2–3 : 1–5 Wexford
 All-Ireland Senior Football Championship Final
Dublin 2–1 : 1–9 Cork

Golf
13 November – Golfing Union of Ireland established at a meeting in Belfast.
Fortwilliam Golf Club in Belfast and Limerick Golf Club are founded.

Births
18 February – John M. O'Sullivan, Cumann na nGaedheal TD and cabinet Minister (died 1948).
21 February – Harry Colley, Fianna Fáil TD, Seanad member (died 1972).
21 February – Seán Heuston, Fianna Éireann member, participant in Easter Rising (executed by firing squad in Kilmainham Jail 1916).
25 February – Edward Daly, participant in Easter Rising (executed by firing squad 1916).
March – Emily Anderson, British Foreign Office official and scholar of German (died 1962).
10 April – Kaye Don, racing driver (died 1981).
11 April – Vincent McNamara, Ireland rugby union player (killed in action on Gallipoli Campaign 1915).
16 April – Richard Saul, British Royal Air Force air vice marshal (died 1965 in the United Kingdom).
13 May – Patrick Hogan, Sinn Féin and Cumann na nGaedheal TD (died 1936).
20 June – John A. Costello, barrister, Attorney-General, Fine Gael TD and twice Taoiseach (died 1976).
3 July
 Arthur Blair-White, cricketer (died 1975).
Bridget Dowling, Adolf Hitler's sister-in-law via her marriage to Alois Hitler, Jr. (died 1969 in the United States).
6 August – Billy Gillespie, soccer player (died 1981).
23 October – John Caffrey, recipient of the Victoria Cross for gallantry in 1915 near La Brique, France (died 1953).
1 November – Peter J. Ward, Sinn Féin (later Cumann na nGaedheal) TD, member 1st Dáil (died 1970).
15 November – Willie Pearse, participant in Easter Rising, brother of Patrick Pearse (executed 1916).
6 December – James Ryan, Fianna Fáil TD Member of 1st Dáil and Cabinet Minister (died 1970).
24 December – Joseph O'Doherty, Sinn Féin MP, Fianna Fáil TD and Seanad member (died 1979).

Deaths
5 May – William Connor Magee, Anglican clergyman, Archbishop of York (born 1821).
18 May – Thomas Grady, soldier, recipient of the Victoria Cross for gallantry at the siege of Sevastopoll in the Crimean War (1854) (born 1835).
15 June – James Patrick Mahon, Irish nationalist politician and international mercenary (born 1800).
6 October – Charles Stewart Parnell, political leader (born 1846).
28 November – William James Lendrim, soldier, recipient of the Victoria Cross for gallantry at the siege of Sevastopoll in the Crimean War (1855) (born 1830).
12 December – Alexander Workman, politician in Canada and mayor of Ottawa (born 1798).
13 December – William Gorman Wills, dramatist and painter (born 1828).
Full date unknown – Augustus Nicholas Burke, artist (born 1838).

References

 
1890s in Ireland
Years of the 19th century in Ireland
Ireland
Ireland